Voorhees University (formerly Voorhees College) is a private historically black university in Denmark, South Carolina. It is affiliated with the Episcopal Church and accredited by the Southern Association of Colleges and Schools.

History
In 1897, Elizabeth Evelyn Wright founded Denmark Industrial School for African Americans. Located in a rural area and the small town of Denmark, it was modeled on the well-known Tuskegee Institute of Alabama. The first classes were held on the second floor of an old store.

In 1902, Ralph Voorhees, a New Jersey philanthropist, gave the school a donation to purchase land and construct buildings.  In 1904 the South Carolina General Assembly renamed the school and incorporated it as the Voorhees Industrial Institute for Colored Youths.

In 1924, the school was affiliated with the Episcopal Diocese of South Carolina. In 1947, its name was changed to Voorhees School and Junior College. In 1962, with the addition of departments and four-year curriculum, it became accredited as Voorhees College.

In 1969, the school's predominantly Black student body demanded more Black study programs and the hiring of Black faculty, as well as outreach to assist the local lower income community of Denmark with scholarships. The Voorhees administration, made up of mostly whites, ignored the students' plea. A demonstration of 500 students began as a response, which eventually inspired 75 students to command a two-day armed student occupation of the college. The president of Voorhees agreed to the students' demands, but filed a formal request to the South Carolina National Guard to subdue the students. The protesters surrendered but were subsequently arrested. Many were suspended.

In 2020, philanthropist MacKenzie Scott donated $4 million to Voorhees College.  Her donation is the largest single gift in Voorhees' history.

The institution changed its name to Voorhees University in 2022 when it celebrated its 125th anniversary.

Voorhees College Historic District

This historic district was listed on the National Register of Historic Places on January 21, 1982.  It includes thirteen contributing buildings constructed from 1905 to 1935.  The historic district is noteworthy as an example of pioneering education for African Americans in the early 20th century, and for its association with co-founder Elizabeth Evelyn Wright.  In addition, the buildings, constructed mostly by students, showed ambitious design and masonry techniques.  Many of these buildings were constructed by the students of Voorhees College as part of their crafts program. Photographs of some of the buildings are available.

Athletics 
The Voorhees athletics teams are called the Tigers and Lady Tigers. The college is a member of the National Association of Intercollegiate Athletics (NAIA), primarily competing as an NAIA Independent within the Continental Athletic Conference since the 2015–16 academic year; which they were a member on a previous stint from 2005–06 to 2012–13 as an Independent within the Association of Independent Institutions (AII). The Tigers and Lady Tigers previously competed in the Gulf Coast Athletic Conference (GCAC) from 2013–14 to 2014–15; and in the defunct Eastern Intercollegiate Athletic Conference (EIAC) from 1983–84 to 2004–05.

Voorhees competes in ten intercollegiate varsity sports: Men's sports include baseball, basketball, cheerleading, cross country and track & field; women's sports include basketball, cheerleading, cross country, softball and track & field.

Greek letter organizations
The university has chapters for eight of the nine National Pan-Hellenic Council organizations.

Notable alumni 
 Jackie Dinkins - NBA player with the Chicago Bulls
Lester Oliver Bankhead (1912–1997), American architect and class of 1941, born in Union, South Carolina and active in Los Angeles, California

References

External links

 Official website
 Official athletics website

 
Historically black universities and colleges in the United States
Educational institutions established in 1897
Private universities and colleges in South Carolina
Education in Bamberg County, South Carolina
Episcopal Church in South Carolina
Anglican education
Universities and colleges affiliated with the Episcopal Church (United States)
Universities and colleges accredited by the Southern Association of Colleges and Schools
Buildings and structures in Bamberg County, South Carolina
1897 establishments in South Carolina